Tajigyna is a monotypic moth genus in the subfamily Arctiinae. Its only species, Tajigyna gansoni, is known from Tajikistan. Both the genus and species were first described by Vladimir Viktorovitch Dubatolov in 1990.

References

Spilosomina
Monotypic moth genera
Moths described in 1990
Moths of Asia